Cat-burning was a form of zoosadistic entertainment in Western and Central Europe during the Middle Ages prior to the 1800s. In this form of entertainment, people would gather dozens of cats in a net and hoist them high into the air from a special bundle onto a bonfire causing death by burning or otherwise through the effects of exposure to extreme heat. In the medieval and early modern periods, cats, which were associated with vanity and witchcraft, were sometimes burned as symbols of the devil. Along with this, other forms of torture and killing of animals were used.

Descriptions
According to Norman Davies, the assembled people "shrieked with laughter as the animals, howling with pain, were singed, roasted, and finally carbonized".

James Frazer wrote:

Cat-burning was also described in The Great Cat Massacre, a scholarly work by American historian Robert Darnton:
Cats also figured in the cycle of Saint John the Baptist, which took place on June 24, at the time of summer solstice. Crowds made bonfires, jumped over them, danced around them, and threw into them objects with magical power, hoping to avoid disaster and obtain good fortune during the rest of the year. A favorite object was cats—cats tied up in bags, cats suspended from ropes, or cats burned at stake. Parisians liked to incinerate cats by the sackful, while the Courimauds (or "cour à miaud" or cat chasers) of Saint Chamond preferred to chase a flaming cat through the streets. In parts of Burgundy and Lorraine they danced around a kind of burning May pole with a cat tied to it. In the Metz region they burned a dozen cats at a time in a basket on top of a bonfire. The ceremony took place with great pomp in Metz itself, until it was abolished in 1765. ... Although the practice varied from place to place, the ingredients were everywhere the same: a "feu de joie" (bonfire), cats, and an aura of hilarious witch-hunting. Wherever the scent of burning felines could be found, a smile was sure to follow.

Cat-burning was the subject of a 1758 text from the Benedictine Dom Jean François, Dissertation sur l’ancien usage des feux de la Saint-Jean, et d’y brûler les chats à Metz, recently published.

History
In the Middle Ages in Western Europe, cats were considered companions of sorcerers and witches. For this reason, the animals were tortured and mass-burned. Especially in this, France and Spain distinguished themselves. In his book "Ivan the Terrible: The Bloody Poet", in response to accusations of Western European authors and ideologists against Russia of savagery and barbarism, Russian author Aleksandr Bushkov writes:

The French had a "nice" habit of burning and hanging cats on the day of John the Baptist. How they annoyed the French so much remains a mystery. The differences between the regions are solely in the specifics of the process: in Paris, cats were stuffed into a bag, hung it higher, and then set on fire. In Saint-Chamond, cats were doused with resin, set on fire, and then chased through the streets. In Burgundy and Lorraine, before setting fire to the "May pole", a cat was bound to it.

See also
 List of common misconceptions about the Middle Ages#Cat massacres and the subsequent plague
 Cruelty to animals
 Kattenstoet (Ypres, Belgium)

References

External links
 Link to Google book excerpt describing cat-burning in France

Animal cruelty incidents
Cruelty to animals
Animal welfare
Animal killing
Cultural history of France
Cultural history of Spain
Cultural history of Belgium
Felids and humans
Entertainment